"You Are More" is a song by the Christian band Tenth Avenue North, released as the second single from their 2010 album The Light Meets the Dark. It is also on the WOW Hits 2012 compilation album. The video for the song won the "Short Form Music Video of the Year" at the 43rd GMA Dove Awards.

Content
The song follows the story of a girl who believes that because of her sins and mistakes, she has "fallen too far to love". The song expresses the belief that a person is more than the mistakes and sins she has committed because she has salvation through Jesus Christ.

Music video
The music video shows the band playing the song in front of a massive chalkboard on which people have written their sins, doubts, mistakes, or questions. As the song reaches its peak, water begins to pour down the chalkboard, washing away the writing, symbolizing Christ washing away the sins of those who embrace Him.

Charts

Weekly charts

Year-end charts

Decade-end charts

Certifications

References

2010 singles
Tenth Avenue North songs
Contemporary Christian songs
2010 songs
Songs written by Jason Ingram